Guy Picken is an Australian former professional rugby league footballer who played in the 1980s and 1990s. He played for St. George and Cronulla-Sutherland in the New South Wales Rugby League (NSWRL) competition.

Playing career
Picken made his first grade debut for Cronulla in round 20 of the 1986 NSWRL season against fierce rivals St. George at the Sydney Cricket Ground. In 1988, Picken played five games for Cronulla as they claimed the Minor Premiership. It was not until 1989 when Picken became a regular in the Cronulla side. He played 15 games that season including their minor preliminary semi-final loss to eventual premiers Canberra. In 1991, Picken signed for St. George where he played 15 games over two seasons.

References

Cronulla-Sutherland Sharks players
St. George Dragons players
Australian rugby league players
Rugby league props
Rugby league hookers
1965 births
Living people